Proutiella infans is a moth of the family Notodontidae. It is only known from in lowland Amazonia in Brazil.

External links
Species page at Tree of Life project

Notodontidae of South America
Moths described in 1856